Jefferson Area High School is the only high School in the Jefferson, Ohio area of the United States. The current principal is Tim Fairfield, and the superintendent is John Montanaro. The school's nickname is "The Fighting Falcons", almost always shortened to "Falcons", and its colors are red, white and black. The logo varies from a falcon in human shape to the old Atlanta Falcons logo flying through a J.

Sports
The school's main rivals are Edgewood, Geneva, Lakeside, and Conneaut High Schools. They compete in the NE8 (Northeast 8 Athletic Conference). The Falcons are former members of the AAC (All American Conference), the NEC (North East Conference), and the GRC (Grand River Conference).

Jefferson's best-known sports figure is Matthew Hatchette who played quarterback for the Falcons high school, but transitioned to wide receiver in college. He was drafted in the 7th round of the NFL Draft by the Minnesota Vikings and also played for the New York Jets, the Jacksonville Jaguars, and the NFL Europa team Amsterdam Admirals before leaving the league after 2003.

Music programs
The school offers programs such as Marching band, Show Choir, Treble Choir, Concert Choir, Jazz Band, and Music Technology.

References

External links
 District Website

High schools in Ashtabula County, Ohio
Public high schools in Ohio